The Jacobin (Jakobín in Czech), Op. 84 (B. 159), is an opera in three acts by Antonín Dvořák to an original Czech libretto by Marie Červinková-Riegrová. Červinková-Riegrová took some of the story's characters from the story by Alois Jirásek, "At the Ducal Court", but devised her own plot about them. The first performance was on 12 February at the National Theatre, Prague, 1889. Červinková-Riegrová revised the libretto, with Dvořák's permission, in 1894, notably in the last act. Dvořák revised the music in 1897 (the revised premiere was on 19 June 1898, under Adolf Čech).

The composer felt great affection for the subject of the opera, as the central character is a music teacher, and Dvořák had in mind his former teacher Antonin Liehmann, who had a daughter named Terinka, the name of one of the opera's characters.

John Clapham has briefly discussed the presence of Czech musical style in the opera. H. C. Colles has described this opera as "the most subtle and intimate of his peasant operas", and noted "how clearly its scenes are drawn from life".

Roles

Synopsis 
Place: a small country town in Bohemia
Time: 1793

Act 1 

Bohuš has returned to his home-town, incognito, with his wife Julie. His mother is dead and his father, the Count, has disowned him and has become a recluse. Meanwhile, the Count's Burgrave pays court to the schoolmaster Benda's daughter, Terinka, who is, however, in love with Jiří. The Burgrave is suspicious of Bohuš and Julie, especially as they have come from Paris, where the Count's son is said to be allied with the Jacobins. To everyone's surprise, the Count himself now appears, confirming that he no longer regards Bohuš as his son, and that his heir will be his nephew Adolf. Adolf and the Burgrave rejoice, while Bohuš and Julie, hidden among the crowd, are horrified at the turn that events have taken.

Act 2 

In the school, Benda rehearses a chorus of children and townsfolk, together with Terinka and Jiří as soloists, in a cantata which will celebrate Adolf's new position. After the rehearsal, Terinka and Jiří declare their love, but Benda returns and announces that his daughter must marry the Burgrave. An argument develops, but suddenly the people return, alarmed at the rumour that sinister Jacobins have arrived in the town. The townsfolk run away in terror as Bohuš and Julie arrive to ask Benda if he can accommodate them for a few days. He is inclined to refuse, but when they reveal that they are Czechs who have sustained themselves in foreign countries through singing the songs of their native land, he, Terinka and Jiří are overcome with emotion and are happy to shelter them. The Burgrave comes to woo Terinka, but she rejects him. When Jiří defies him, the Burgrave threatens to force him into the army, but suddenly Adolf enters, wanting to find out if the "Jacobin" (Bohuš) has been arrested. The Burgrave prevaricates, but Bohuš himself arrives and reveals who he is. He and Adolf quarrel, and Adolf orders Bohuš's arrest.

Act 3 

At the castle, Jiří tries to see the Count to tell him that his son has been imprisoned, but is himself arrested at the behest of Adolf and the Burgrave. Lotinka admits Julie and Benda, and goes to fetch the Count. Julie hides, and Benda tries to prepare the old man for a reconciliation with Bohuš. The Count, however, is still angry with his son for marrying and leaving Bohemia and for his alleged Jacobin sympathies. Benda departs, and the Count laments his lonely life and wonders whether he has, after all, misjudged his son. Offstage, Julie sings a song that the late Countess used to sing to Bohuš when he was a child, and the Count, recognising it and overcome with emotion, asks Julie where she learnt it. Once he discovers that it was his son who taught it to her, his anger returns, but Julie is able to convince him that Bohuš, far from being a Jacobin, supported the Girondins and had been condemned to death by the Jacobins. She now reveals that Bohuš is in prison and that she is his wife, but the celebrations are about to start, and she leaves.

The children and townsfolk rejoice, and the Count announces that he will present his successor to them. Adolf is overjoyed, but the Count first enquires of him and the Burgrave whether there are any prisoners that he can pardon as part of the festivities. They reluctantly admit that there are, and Bohuš and Jiří are summoned. The Burgrave realises that the game is up as the Count denounces the scheming Adolf and embraces Bohuš and Julie. Bohuš praises the loyalty of Jiří and Terinka, and the Count joins their hands. Benda gives them his blessing, and the opera ends with a minuet, a polka and a chorus praising the Count and his new-found happiness with his son and his family.

Recordings
 Hamburger Archiv Für Gesangskunst  PN 34021: (Sung in German) Josef Becker, Hans-Jürgen Demitz, Gabriele Maria Ronge, Jörn W. Wilsing, Josef Hopferwieser, Richard Kogel, Wolf Appel; Symphonisches Orchester Berlin; Fritz Weisse, conductor; Bonus; Karl Elmendorff, conductor, excerpts (1943)
Hamburger Archiv Für Gesangskunst  PN 30474: (Sung in German) Artur Kern, Robert Granzer, Mirjana Irosch, Rudolf Katzböck, Adolf Dallapozza, Jolanta Radek; Orchester der Wiener Volksoper; Ivan Parik (conductor)
Archipel P 2013: (Sung in German) Walter Berry, Andreas Agrelli, Trude Arthold, Franz Fuchs, Leo Heppe, Waldemar Kmentt, Fritz Uhl, Gisela Rathauscher, Susanne Naidic; Tonkünstlerchor, Großes Wiener Rundfunkorchester; Kurt Tenner, conductor (Feb. 1952)
Supraphon 11 2190-2 612: Karel Průša, Karel Berman, Ivana Mixová, Vilém Přibyl, Beno Blachut, Václav Zítek, René Tuček, Daniela Šounová-Brouková, Marcela Machotková; Kühn mixed choir; Children's chorus of the Brno Philharmonic Orchestra-Kantilena; Brno Philharmonic Orchestra; Jiří Pinkas, conductor (1972)
Fonè  024 2SACD: Valentin Pivovarov, Markus Werba, Alessandro Grato, Tatiana Monogarova; National Philharmonic Orchestra of Belarus, Wexford Festival Opera Chorus, Alexandre Voloschuk, conductor (2001)
 Orfeo 641 043: Mark Holland, Marcin Bronikowski, Christoph Stephinger, Andrea Danková, Peter Mikuláš, Michal Lehotský, Eberhard Francesco Lorenz, Lívia Ághová, Mechthild Georg; WDR Sinfonieorchester Köln, Prague Chamber Choir and WDR Rundfunkchor Köln, Gerd Albrecht, conductor (2003)
Profil Title Number 15: (Dresden Edition); Robert Burg, Mathieu Ahlersmeyer, Heinrich Pflanzl, Sven Nilsson, Elfriede Trötschel, Margarete Teschemacher; Chor der Staatsoper Dresden, Dresden State Opera Children Chorus, Staatskapelle Dresden; Karl Elmendorff, conductor (2007)

References
Notes

External links
Information on a comprehensive Dvořák site
Upcoming performances from Operabase.com

Operas by Antonín Dvořák
Operas
1889 operas
Czech-language operas